PKP Intercity is a company of PKP Group responsible for long-distance passenger transport. It runs about 350 trains daily, connecting mainly large agglomerations and smaller towns in Poland. The company also provides most international trains to and from Poland. Trains offer Wi-Fi connectivity.

History
The company was founded after splitting Polskie Koleje Państwowe (national rail operator) into several companies to meet European Union standards.

Operations
The company runs the following train categories:
 Express InterCity Premium (EIP, EIC Premium) – domestic exclusive high-speed trains (ED250 New Pendolino) between major cities with obligatory reservation.
 Express InterCity (EIC) – high-standard express trains between major cities and popular tourist destinations:
 InterCity – affordable high-standard express trains and fast trains with obligatory reservation; higher standard and priority than TLK but the same fare. Exclusive high-standard express trains - Pesa Dart and Stadler Flirt also run under the InterCity brand.
 EuroCity (EC) – international high-standard trains, reservation obligatory, on domestic routes runs under InterCity and Express InterCity brand,
 EuroNight (EN) – international night trains with obligatory reservation.
 Twoje Linie Kolejowe (TLK, "Your Rail Lines"; formerly called Tanie Linie Kolejowe, "Cheap Rail Lines" from 2005–2011) – affordable fast trains with obligatory reservation (with some exceptions); lower standard than InterCity. Some overnight TLK trains such as Przemyślanin and Ustronie provide couchette and sleeper cars. A limited number of shorter-route TLK trains is 2nd-class only. Usually run by locomotive-hauled rakes and more rarely Pesa Bydgostia EMUs.
 Międzynarodowy (M) – international fast train (lower standard than EuroCity)
 Międzynarodowy nocny – international night train (lower standard than EuroNight)

Rolling stock

Electric locomotives

Diesel locomotives

Electric multiple units

See also 
 Rail transport in Poland
 Polish locomotives designation

References

External links 
 Official list of all PKP IC trains
 Online timetable

Railway companies of Poland
PKP Group companies
Polish brands
Companies based in Warsaw
Transport companies established in 2001
Polish companies established in 2001